The Jameh Mosque of Khansar dates back to the 12th century and is located in Khansar, the entrance of the city, the old cemetery.

Sources 

Mosques in Isfahan Province
Mosque buildings with domes
National works of Iran
Khansar